The 2017–18 Eastern Washington Eagles Women's basketball team represents Eastern Washington University during the 2017–18 NCAA Division I women's basketball season. The Eagles are led by seventeenth year head coach Wendy Schuller and play their home games at Reese Court. They were members of the Big Sky Conference. They finished the season 17–14, 12–6 in Big Sky play to finish in a tie for third place. They lost in the quarterfinals of the Big Sky women's tournament to Portland State.

Roster

Schedule

|-
!colspan=8 style="background:#; color:#FFFFFF;"| Exhibition

|-
!colspan=8 style="background:#; color:#FFFFFF;"| Non-conference regular season

|-
!colspan=8 style="background:#; color:#FFFFFF;"| Big Sky regular season

|-
!colspan=9 style="background:#; color:#FFFFFF;"| Big Sky Women's Tournament

See also
2017–18 Eastern Washington Eagles men's basketball team

References

Eastern Washington Eagles women's basketball seasons
Eastern Washington
Eastern Washington
Eastern Washington